Basic Education High School No. 2 Kamayut (abbreviated to အ.ထ.က. (၂) ကမာရွတ်; formerly, State High School Kamayut or St. Augustine's School; commonly known as Kamayut 2 High School) is one of the best known public high school located in Kamayut Township, Yangon, Myanmar (Burma). The school offers classes from kindergarten to 11th standard (Grade 1 to Grade 12).

Notable alumni

Singers
Soe Lwin Lwin
Khine Htoo
Si Thu Lwin
Myo Myo
Phyo Gyi
Nan Naunt Naunt
Nge Sue
Shwe Htoo
Aye Mya Phyu

Actors
Kyi Lae Lae Oo
Phway Phway
Wutt Hmone Shwe Yi
Nang Mwe San
Sweet Wuttyi Thaung
Ei Chaw Po

References

External links 
 Kamayut 2 webpage

High schools in Yangon